Channing D. Tindall (born March 28, 2000) is an American football linebacker for the Miami Dolphins of the National Football League (NFL). He played college football at Georgia.

High school career
Tindall attended Spring Valley High School in Columbia, South Carolina. He played in the 2018 U.S. Army All-American Bowl. He committed to the University of Georgia to play college football.

College career
As a true freshman at Georgia in 2018, Tindall played in 14 games and had 17 tackles and 2.5 sacks. As a sophomore in 2019, he played in 11 games and had nine tackles and 1.5 sacks. He played in 10 games his junior year in 2020, recording 15 tackles and three sacks. Tindall returned to Georgia for his senior year in 2021.

Professional career

Tindall was drafted by the Miami Dolphins in the third round, 102nd overall, of the 2022 NFL Draft.

References

External links
 Miami Dolphins bio
Georgia Bulldogs bio

Living people
Players of American football from Columbia, South Carolina
American football linebackers
Georgia Bulldogs football players
Miami Dolphins players
2000 births